My Remembrance of You is the 2006 breakthrough album by Diana Jones.

Track listing 
All songs written by Diana Jones
 "Pretty Girl" – 3:10 
 "My Beloved" – 3:29 
 "All My Money on You" – 3:09 
 "Pony" – 4:40 
 "A Hold on Me" – 4:20 
 "Up in Smoke" – 4:25 
 "Cold Grey Ground" – 2:21 
 "Fever Moon" – 3:12 
 "Lay Me Down" – 4:13 
 "Willow Tree" – 2:53 
 "My Remembrance of You" – 3:40

References 

2006 albums
Diana Jones (singer-songwriter) albums